The bubble dance is an erotic dance made famous by Sally Rand in the 1930s. The dancer (sometimes naked) dances with a huge bubble shaped like a balloon or ball placed between her body and the audience to make some interesting poses.

In Tex Avery's cartoon Hollywood Steps Out (1941) which depicted various Hollywood celebrities, a rotoscoped Rand performs her famous bubble dance onstage to an appreciative crowd. A grinning Peter Lorre caricature in the front row comments, "I haven't seen such a beautiful bubble since I was a child." The routine continues until the bubble is suddenly popped by Harpo Marx and his slingshot, with a surprised Rand (her nudity covered by a well-placed wooden barrel) reacting with shock. Rand is referred to as "Sally Strand" here.

Sally Rand's bubble dance is featured in a short clip in the Sunset Murder Case.

References

Erotic dance